Tiger Island is a 1930 silent Australian film about a father and daughter living on an island off the Victorian coast who become involved in drug running. It is considered a lost film.

Plot
An old man and his beautiful daughter are lured to an island on the Victorian coast with the promise of a share in a deceased person's estate. The father finds the fortune was made from drug smuggling, the contraband being dropped off by passing steamers.

The old man joins the drug trade. A detective investigates and falls for the girl. The drug smuggler is unmasked, the old man is exonerated and the detective is united with the girl.

Cast
Beth Darvall
John Barry
Godfrey Cass
Charles Brown
Thelma Banks

Production
The film was shot as a silent movie in 1929, in Melbourne and off the coast of Victoria. Advertisements for crew were listed in March, and the movie was complete by June. It was the second feature from the Victorian FIlm Production syndicate.

Release
The coming of sound pictures limited its commercial chances.

The film was one of only four films entered in the  Commonwealth government's £10,000 film competition. Of the four, it was judged the third best, after Fellers (1930) and The Cheaters (1930) but in front of The Nation of Tomorrow. However, only Fellers was ruled eligible for a prize.

References

External links
Tiger Island in the Internet Movie Database
Tiger Island at Oz Movies

1930 films
Lost Australian films
Australian silent films
Australian black-and-white films
1930 lost films
Films directed by Gerald M. Hayle